Yxskaftkälen is a village of Strömsund Municipality, Jämtland County in northern Sweden. The name origins from the wood which was suitable for making handles to an axe. The village was founded in 1758. The population is about 90. 
Village website

See also
Flykälen

Populated places in Strömsund Municipality
Jämtland
Populated places established in 1758